Boomer is the surname of:

 Aubrey Boomer (1897-1989), professional golfer
 Bill Boomer (1937-2022), former head coach of the men's swim team at the University of Rochester
 Edward J. Boomer (born 1821), member of the Wisconsin State Assembly
 Garth Boomer (1940-1993), an influential educationalist working in Australia
 George Boomer (1862–1915), American socialist journalist, newspaper editor, and political activist
 George B. Boomer (1832–1863), Union Army colonel in the American Civil War
 Harry Boomer (born 1953), newscaster for WOIO news in Cleveland, Ohio
 Jørgine Boomer (1887–1971), Norwegian-American businesswoman and entrepreneur
 Linwood Boomer (born 1955), Canadian television producer
 Percy Boomer (1885-1949), English golfer
 Walter E. Boomer (born 1938), retired former four-star general and Assistant Commandant of the United States Marine Corps and business executive